Sergei Aleksandrovich Luchina (born 12 January 1974) is a former Russian football player.

References

1974 births
Living people
Soviet footballers
Russian footballers
FC Uralets Nizhny Tagil players
FC Ural Yekaterinburg players
Russian Premier League players
Association football defenders